Effete and Impudent Snobs is the third album by the Minneapolis-based noise rock band Cows. It was released on March 23, 1990, by Amphetamine Reptile Records.

Track listing

Personnel
Adapted from the Effete and Impudent Snobs liner notes.

Cows
Thor Eisentrager – guitar
Tony Oliveri – drums
Kevin Rutmanis – bass guitar
Shannon Selberg – vocals, bugle

Production and additional personnel
Cows – production
Tim Mac – engineering
Günter Pauler – mastering
Dave Vandersteen – production, engineering

Release history

References

External links 
 

1990 albums
Cows (band) albums
Amphetamine Reptile Records albums